Hong Jong-o (홍종오, born 7 July 1925) is a South Korean long-distance runner. He competed in the marathon at the 1948 Summer Olympics and the 1952 Summer Olympics.

References

1925 births
Living people
Athletes (track and field) at the 1948 Summer Olympics
Athletes (track and field) at the 1952 Summer Olympics
South Korean male long-distance runners
South Korean male marathon runners
Olympic athletes of South Korea
Place of birth missing (living people)
20th-century South Korean people